Depot Valley Falls is a  waterfall on the Custer Fork Depot Creek that shares the same cliff as the nearby, much larger Depot Creek Falls, both in Whatcom County, Washington, United States.

Naming
The Custer Fork Depot Creek is an informal name for the actually unnamed stream. This name refers to the stream's source, Mount Custer.

Notes

Waterfalls of Washington (state)
North Cascades of Washington (state)
Waterfalls of Whatcom County, Washington
Cascade waterfalls